Trachyaretaon carmelae is a species of stick insects. Even if there was no formal synonymisation, Trachyaretaon brueckneri is generally used as its synonym.

Characteristics 
At  in length, males remain significantly smaller. The animals have yellow eyes and are mostly light to dark brown in color. Occasionally specimens appear with reddish (mostly female) or greenish (mostly male) brown tones. The rear edges of the abdomen segments and of the prothorax are lighter, orange-brown or pinkish-brown in color. Females occasionally have one or two white abdominal segments and often small white areas on the thorax (for example, paired white spots on the mesothorax). The habitus corresponds to that of the rest of the genus. The lateral edges of the meso- and metathorax are keeled and clearly jagged (serrated). Both thoracic segments become wider towards the rear, with the rear edge of the mesothorax being significantly wider than the front edge of the metathorax, the rear edge of which is the widest part of the body. On the meso- and metathorax there is a pair of very short spines, which form the highest point of the thorax and are surrounded by inconspicuous, small spines. Overall, adult specimens are less spiny than many other members of the genus and have a relatively smooth and shiny body surface.

Distribution and taxonomy 
Trachyaretaon carmelae is native to the Babuyan Islands belonging to the Philippines. Ireneo L. Lit, Jr. and Orlando L. Eusebio described the species in 2005 on specimens that were collected the year before on the island Dalupiri and deposited a female as holotype, as well as various paratypes, including males, nymphs and eggs, at the University of the Philippines in Los Baños, Laguna. Already in 2003 specimens were found on the neighboring Calayan Island, these were described by Oskar V. Conle and Frank H. Hennemann as Trachyaretaon brueckneri. The specific epithet was chosen in honor of Martin Brückner, a Munich biologist and friend of the authors. A male has been deposited as holotype in the Bavarian State Collection of Zoology. This description was only published in 2006 due to delays in its publication. It quickly became clear that the name given by Lit and Eusebio should be given priority, as they are representatives of the same species. Although Trachyaretaon brueckneri has not been formally synonymized, it is used by authors of the species as well as in more recent works always referred to as Trachyaretaon carmelae.

Way of life and reproduction 
 The nocturnal and twilight-active animals usually sit on the food plants. The adult males can often be carried around by the females for weeks. In the absence of adult females, they also mount the females of other members of the tribe Obrimini. During the mating the male pushes a greenish colored seed carrier (spermatophore) under the subgenital plate of the female. They resemble the animals' own droppings and are strongly reminiscent of those of other Obrimini such as Aretaon asperrimus, of which they only resemble the hard to recognize, an upside down "Y" micropylar plate distinguish. At the front pole of the eggs there is a circular lid (operculum), which the nymphs push on when they hatch three to four months after laying the eggs. The very variably colored nymphs grow into adults over the next seven months. The Imago then live another five to eight months.

In terraristics 
Trachyaretaon carmelae does not make high demands on the keeping conditions in the terrarium. It can easily be fed on the leaves of bramble. In addition, oak, firethorn, ivy and hazel are also accepted. A slightly moist soil layer a few centimeters thick or a correspondingly filled flower pot must be present in the terrarium to enable the females to lay their eggs.

The species is listed by the Phasmid Study Group under PSG number 255 and will continue to be referred to as Trachyaretaon brueckneri, as the breeding stock goes back to the specimens introduced by Conle and Hennemann, it must be correctly referred to as Trachyaretaon carmelae 'Calayan Island'.
A female's wrist bite has been documented by Philip Edward Bragg, a behavior which is rather unusual for stick insects.

Gallery

References

External links

Phasmatodea
Phasmatodea of Asia
Insects described in 2005